The ÖBL All-Star Game – or Admiral Basketball League (ABL) All-Star Game is a yearly event held by the Österreichische Basketball Bundesliga. It yearly matches the league's star players from Europe against their counterparts from the world. It is the featured event of ÖBL All-Star Day. The All-Star game was first staged at the FZZ Happyland in Klosterneuburg in 1995.

All-Star Games

References

All-Star Game
Basketball all-star games